John Butler (1503/4? – 1572 or 1573), of Warwick, was an English politician.

He was a Member (MP) of the Parliament of England for Warwick in 1558 and 1563.

References

1503 births
1572 deaths
People from Warwick
English MPs 1558
English MPs 1563–1567